Dick Brown (May 9, 1926 – May 20, 2000) was a Canadian football player who played for the Hamilton Tiger-Cats, Toronto Argonauts, and Montreal Alouettes. He won the Grey Cup with Hamilton in 1953. He previously played football for the University of Toronto. He later served as Director of Athletics for the University of Guelph.

References

1926 births
2000 deaths
Hamilton Tiger-Cats players
University of Toronto alumni
Players of Canadian football from Cleveland